August Aimé (Guus) Balkema (6 October 1906, in Avereest – 4 September 1996, in Rotterdam), or A. A. Balkema, was a Dutch book trader and publisher active in Amsterdam and South Africa. He played a prominent role in the South African publishing world and was included in They shaped our century (1999), a list of the 100 most influential people in South Africa in the 20th century.

Life and career

Early years 

Balkema was born in Avereest in Overijssel, the son of Sijbrand Harkes Balkema and Antje Tjitske Gelderman.  On 18 January 1936 in Zandvoort, he wed Anna Stehouwer.

Amsterdam 

During the Second World War, the bookstore was used to clandestinely print and publish works of poetry and other literature. In the series , which Balkema started in 1942, fifty works were published during the war, including works by Dutch poets like A. Roland Holst and Martinus Nijhoff as well as books in English and French, languages banned by the German occupiers. The prominent typographer Jan van Krimpen handled many of these publications. In 1945 Balkema published a catalogue of the series under the name  ('Catalogue of fifty books published without permission in the years 1942−1945').

In 1943 Balkema, along with Adriaan Morriën en Fred Batten, started the series . After the war, this series was taken over by the publishing house .

The compartment may also have served as a hiding place for (Jewish)  (people hiding from the Germans).

South Africa 

In 1946, after the end of the war, Balkema sold his bookstore in Amsterdam and left for South Africa to pursue a career as a publisher there. That same year, he published his first book in South Africa,  by the South African poet C. Louis Leipoldt.

Balkema quickly established his name by publishing specialist books which had often been refused by the more established publishing houses. These included such works as the Hertzog Prize-winning  by Elise Muller (1957). Before long, many South African writers began to approach Balkema of their own accord to request that he publish their work. These included Jan Rabie whose  was the first Afrikaans-language anti-apartheid novel, evoking much criticism and controversy when it was published in 1958.

Balkema was known for the high quality of the books he published, in particular the typography and design. He was one of the first South African publishers to switch to an IBM typewriter for typesetting. He also introduced non-justified text to the country.

His perhaps greatest contribution was to Afrikaans-language nonfiction. A large number of books on South African nature, architecture, culture, and history were authored and published on his initiative, and are still considered standard works in their respective fields. He also published English-language literature and academic books and journals.

Later years
In the 1960s, Balkema decided to end his career as a publisher. During a visit to his family in the Netherlands in 1986, he fell severely ill. He and his wife Annie decided to re-settle in the Netherlands, where they remained until their deaths, hers in 1994 and his in 1996.

Legacy 
In 1984 a liber amicorum in his honour was published by Vriende van die S.A. Biblioteek, Liber amicorum pro A.A. Balkema.

Balkema was included in They shaped our century (1999), a list of the 100 most influential people in South Africa in the 20th century.

His son started a technical and scientific publisher in Rotterdam, naming it A A Balkema Publishers after his father. This imprint is now part of the Taylor & Francis Group as CRC Press / Balkema.

References

1906 births
1996 deaths
Dutch publishers (people)
People from Avereest
South African book publishers (people)
People from Cape Town
Dutch emigrants to South Africa